Igor Petković (born 3 September 1983) is a Serbian/Montenegrin footballer.

Club career
Born in Rijeka Crnojevića, SR Montenegro, he played for Vorskla Poltava, Dynamo Kyiv and Zorya Luhansk in Ukrainian Premier League. From 2010 to 2012 he played for Mash'al Mubarek in Uzbek League. In February 2013 he moved to Olmaliq FK.

External links
 
 Profile at Srbijafudbal
 

1983 births
Living people
People from Cetinje Municipality
Association football fullbacks
Serbia and Montenegro footballers
Serbian footballers
Montenegrin footballers
FK Mladost Apatin players
FC Vorskla Poltava players
FC Dynamo Kyiv players
FC Dynamo-2 Kyiv players
FC Dynamo-3 Kyiv players
FK Liepājas Metalurgs players
FK Čukarički players
FC Zorya Luhansk players
FK Srem players
FK Mash'al Mubarek players
FC AGMK players
FK Neftchi Farg'ona players
Expatriate footballers in Ukraine
Serbian SuperLiga players
Ukrainian Premier League players
Ukrainian First League players
Ukrainian Second League players
Latvian Higher League players
Uzbekistan Super League players
Serbia and Montenegro expatriate footballers
Serbia and Montenegro expatriate sportspeople in Ukraine
Montenegrin expatriate footballers
Expatriate footballers in Latvia
Montenegrin expatriate sportspeople in Latvia
Serbian expatriate sportspeople in Latvia
Montenegrin expatriate sportspeople in Ukraine
Serbian expatriate sportspeople in Ukraine
Expatriate footballers in Uzbekistan
Montenegrin expatriate sportspeople in Uzbekistan
Serbian expatriate sportspeople in Uzbekistan